Charlie's Angels is a 2019 American action comedy film written and directed by Elizabeth Banks from a story by Evan Spiliotopoulos and David Auburn. It stars Kristen Stewart, Naomi Scott, and Ella Balinska as the new generation of Angels who are working for a private detective agency named the Townsend Agency. The film is the third installment in the Charlie's Angels film series and serves as a continuation of the story that began with the television series of the same name by Ivan Goff and Ben Roberts, and the two previous theatrical films, Charlie's Angels (2000) and Charlie's Angels: Full Throttle (2003).

Development of the film began in September 2015 when Sony Pictures opted to reboot the series following the cancellation of the 2011 television reboot and the release of 2003's Full Throttle. Months later, Banks joined the project as director, producer, and writer. Casting announcements were made throughout 2018, with Banks herself also confirmed to star. Principal photography commenced in September 2018 and took place in Germany and Turkey. The lead single from the film's soundtrack, "Don't Call Me Angel", performed by Ariana Grande, Miley Cyrus, and Lana Del Rey, was released in September 2019, followed by the soundtrack and score album's respective releases on November 1 and 8.

Charlie's Angels was theatrically released in the United States on November 15, 2019, by Sony Pictures Releasing to mixed reviews from critics and a poor opening weekend box office performance. It was ranked by both USA Today and Variety as one of the biggest box-office disappointments of 2019. The film eventually grossed $73.3 million worldwide against an estimated production budget of $48–55 million and an estimated advertising budget of $50 million.

Plot
A team of Angels, led by senior operative John Bosley, capture international embezzler Jonny Smith in Rio de Janeiro and turn him over to American authorities. A year later, the European division of the Townsend Agency is informed that Elena Houghlin, an engineer and programmer employed by entrepreneur Alexander Brok, wants to expose her superiors. She knows that Brok's head of development, Peter Fleming, is covering up a discovery about how an energy conservation device that she helped invent, Calisto, has the potential to trigger fatal seizures when used. She meets with operative Edgar "Bosley" in Hamburg to turn over her findings, but an assassin named Hodak ambushes the meeting and subsequently kills Edgar, leaving Elena to drown. Edgar's protégé, Jane Kano, rescues her and brings her to operative Rebekah "Bosley" with the help of her partner, Sabina Wilson. Meanwhile, John, who has since retired from the agency, discovers that Rebekah has tagged him with the agency's specialized subdermal implant without his knowledge.

Rebekah tasks Sabina and Jane, joined by Elena, with breaking into Brok's corporate headquarters to steal the remaining Calisto prototypes before they can be duplicated. Elena finds one but is forced to use it to escape, accidentally killing the chief of security, Ralph, in the process. After learning that Fleming took the other prototypes, Rebekah tracks him to Istanbul, where Jane utilizes one of her old intelligence contacts, Fatima, to locate him. They track him to a remote rock quarry, where the supposedly imprisoned Smith is revealed to be Fleming's intermediary for selling Calisto. Hodak is also present and kills Fleming before the Angels break up the sale. Rebekah suddenly disappears, allowing Smith and Hodak to escape with the prototypes.

Returning to their safehouse, Sabina shares her growing belief that Rebekah is secretly working against the agency and manipulating them to steal Calisto for her own benefit. While the three ponder Sabina's suspicion, the safehouse is bombed. Rebekah shows up only to be shot by John, who has come to rescue Elena. Sabina and Jane manage to survive and seek medical help from Fatima. Rebekah reappears and explains that John is the real traitor and that he has spent the last few decades secretly building his own network within the agency after he was passed over to succeed the late Charlie Townsend.

John takes Elena to a party in Chamonix hosted by Brok, who reveals himself as the mastermind behind the attempt to assassinate Elena and, unbeknownst to him, John's plan to weaponize Calisto. Using Elena's colleague Langston as a hostage, John forces her to program a Calisto device to kill both herself and Langston before leaving. The Angels, having deduced his plan due to the information provided by Smith, who is later revealed to have defected to their side, show up and rescue Elena and Langston, Elena having already disabled the Calisto device. Jane exacts revenge by impaling Hodak on a spike, while Rebekah catches up with John and his men. Outnumbered, she has other Angels posing as guests subdue the men, after which Sabina knocks out John with a punch. Brok is arrested for conspiracy, and Jane and Langston start a relationship. Elena is recruited as an Angel by the Townsend Agency after passing a series of rigorous training exercises.

In a mid-credits scene, Elena receives an official Angels tattoo and congratulations from former Angel Kelly Garrett (Jaclyn Smith), who has become the new "Charlie".

Cast
 Kristen Stewart as Sabina Wilson, a wild and rebellious Angel
 Naomi Scott as Elena Houghlin, an engineer, programmer, and creator of the Calisto project, who gets recruited to become an Angel
 Ella Balinska as Jane Kano, a former MI6 agent who became an Angel
 Elizabeth Banks as Rebekah "Bosley", a former Angel who became one of Charlie's assistants
 Djimon Hounsou as Edgar "Bosley" Dessange, one of Charlie's assistants
 Sam Claflin as Alexander Brok, Elena's employer
 Noah Centineo as Langston, Elena's assistant
 Nat Faxon as Peter Fleming, Elena's superior
 Patrick Stewart as John Bosley, Charlie's first and original assistant. Stewart replaces Bill Murray, who portrayed the character in the first installment.
 Chris Pang as Jonny Smith, an international smuggler
 Jonathan Tucker as Hodak, an assassin
 Luis Gerardo Méndez as the Saint, a Townsend Agency employee specializing in weapons and technology
 David Schütter as Ralph, the chief of security at Brok's corporate
 Hannah Hoekstra as Ingrid, an Angel who works as a secretary at Brok's corporate
 Marie-Lou Sellem as Fatima Ahmed, Jane's contact in Istanbul
 Robert Clotworthy as the voice of Charles "Charlie" Townsend, the owner of the Townsend Agency. Clotworthy replaces John Forsythe, who voiced the character in the television series and previous film installments, following Forsythe's death in 2010.

Making cameo appearances in the film are Hailee Steinfeld, Lili Reinhart, Aly Raisman, Huda Kattan, and Chloe Kim as newly recruited Angels; Ronda Rousey, Danica Patrick, and Laverne Cox as the Angels' instructors; and Michael Strahan as the Townsend Agency's New York branch "Bosley". Jaclyn Smith also makes a cameo appearance as Kelly Garrett, reprising her character from the television series for her second appearance in the film series, after cameoing in the second theatrical film. Still photographs of Kate Jackson, Farrah Fawcett, Cheryl Ladd, Cameron Diaz, Drew Barrymore, and Lucy Liu as their respective characters from the television series and previous installments also appear on a screen in the Townsend Agency's Los Angeles office.

Production

In September 2015, Sony Pictures Entertainment announced that it was rebooting the Charlie's Angels franchise, with Elizabeth Banks in talks to direct the film, as well as produce, with her Brownstone Productions partner Max Handelman. Evan Spiliotopoulos was hired to write the script for the reboot film. Banks was officially confirmed as the film's director the following year in April, and rewrote the screenplay, which had previously been rewritten by Jay Basu, along with earlier touch-ups by Craig Mazin and Semi Chellas. Banks received sole screenplay credit, with "story by" billing for Spiliotopoulos and David Auburn.

In July 2018, it was announced that Kristen Stewart, Naomi Scott and Ella Balinska would play the leading trio of the fighting team and that Banks would also appear as a Bosley, with the film featuring multiple characters by that name. Doug Belgrad also co-produced the film through his 2.0 Entertainment, along with Elizabeth Cantillon, Banks, and Handelman. Patrick Stewart was cast as a second Bosley in September. That same month, Luis Gerardo Méndez and Jonathan Tucker joined the cast of the film, with Djimon Hounsou added as a third Bosley, while Bill Pope was announced as the film's cinematographer. Sam Claflin, Noah Centineo, Chris Pang and Nat Faxon later joined the cast in October 2018.

Principal photography on the film began on September 24, 2018. Filming took place at the Elbphilharmonie in Hamburg, Germany from October 2–7. Further filming took place at the Spice Bazaar, Veliefendi Race Course, and Sultanahmet, all in Istanbul, Turkey in early December. Filming completed on December 9.

Initially developed as a reboot of the franchise, the film instead serves as a continuation of the events of the original TV series and the McG-directed films. Drew Barrymore, who had produced and starred in the previous film installments, executive produced the film. Producer of the original series and first two films Leonard Goldberg came on board as an executive producer as well.

Music

Musician Brian Tyler composed the film's score, while singer Ariana Grande co-executive produced the soundtrack along with music producer Savan Kotecha and record executive Scooter Braun. Grande collaborated with fellow singers Miley Cyrus and Lana Del Rey on a song titled "Don't Call Me Angel", which was released as the lead single from the soundtrack on September 13, 2019. A promotional single, "How It's Done", by Kash Doll, Kim Petras, Alma, and Stefflon Don, was released on October 11. A second promotional single, "Pantera", by Brazilian singer Anitta, was released on October 23. The soundtrack and score albums were released on November 1 and 8, respectively.

Release

Theatrical
Charlie's Angels was released on November 15, 2019, by Columbia Pictures. Prior to this, Sony Pictures Releasing announced that the film would also be released in IMAX format in select theaters. The film was originally set for November 1 date, but was pushed back to avoid competition with Terminator: Dark Fate.

The first theatrical trailer for the film was released on June 27, followed by the second trailer on October 11. While Sony had originally intended to spend $100 million to promote the film, the company reduced the overall promotional cost to approximately $50 million in light of the film's underperformance during its opening weekend.

Home media
Charlie's Angels was released digitally on February 18, 2020, and on Blu-ray and DVD on March 10.

Reception

Box office
Charlie's Angels grossed $17.8 million in the United States and Canada, and $55.5 million in other territories, for a worldwide total of $73.3 million.

In the United States and Canada, the film was released alongside Ford v Ferrari and The Good Liar, and was projected to gross $10–12 million from 3,452 theaters in its opening weekend. However, after making $3.1 million on its first day (including $900,000 from Thursday night previews), it went on to debut to just $8.4 million, finishing in third place. Following the film's poor opening weekend, Deadline Hollywood cited the film's mixed critical response and a lack of public interest in the franchise as reasons for the underperformance. The Hollywood Reporter also observed that the film specifically "failed to attract moviegoers over the age of 35", as well as "younger females—its target audience—in enough numbers". In response to the film's opening weekend underperformance, Banks stated that she was proud of the film regardless. The film fell 61% to $3.2 million in its second weekend, finishing in eighth. USA Today and Variety ranked the film as one of the biggest box office failures of 2019.

Critical response
The website's critics consensus reads: "Earnest and energetic, if a bit uneven, Elizabeth Banks's pulpy Charlie's Angels adds new flair to the franchise with fun performances from its three leads". On Metacritic, the film has a weighted average score of 52 out of 100, based on 41 critics, indicating "mixed or average reviews". Audiences polled by CinemaScore gave the film an average grade of "B+" on an A+ to F scale, while those surveyed by PostTrak gave it an overall positive score of 69% (including an average 3 out of 5 stars), with 46% saying they would definitely recommend it.

Beandrea July of The Hollywood Reporter commended how the film "honors its precursors while elevating itself beyond them", while Sandra Hall of The Sydney Morning Herald opined that the film exudes a "jaunty feel" as well as incorporates "a few well-placed plot twists, lots of good-humored banter and the usual fun to be had from the Angels' fondness for disguise." Owen Gleiberman of Variety praised Elizabeth Banks' direction as a source of the film's strength, stating that she "proves herself to be a filmmaker who can stage fireworks with extreme flair." Writing for The Boston Globe, Tom Russo favorably regarded Kristen Stewart's performance as "a completely unexpected, who-knew mash-up of sexy and offbeat". Likewise, Mark Lieberman of The Washington Post wrote that Stewart "upstages everyone, from the opening close-up on her gleeful grin to her array of colorful costumes, riotous non sequiturs and unconventional posture choices".

In a mixed review, Peter Travers of Rolling Stone was critical of the film's pacing and comedic dialogue, but highlighted Stewart, Naomi Scott, and Ella Balinska as "the angels you need when a movie needs rescuing." Similarly, Michael Phillips of the Chicago Tribune commented that the film's characters "have their fun, and we have a reasonable percentage of theirs," while the New York Posts Johnny Oleksinski noted conversely that the three actresses "click as a unit, but lack much of the exuberance and distinctiveness of their predecessors." Stephanie Zacharek of Time negatively regarded the film as "a shaggy, listless action movie that's too messy to be fun," the Los Angeles Times Kenneth Turan deemed the plot "overly complicated", The Detroit Newss Adam Graham criticized the film as "out-of-style," and in an even more scathing review, BBC Online columnist Nicholas Barber called it "grimly unimaginative" and "tediously formulaic."

During an interview with The New York Times, Banks — who wrote, directed and co-starred in the movie — weighing in on why she feels the marketing for Charlie’s Angels didn’t quite work:“I’ll just be in trouble. Let me say I’m proud of the movie. I loved Kristen Stewart being funny and light. I loved introducing Ella Balinska to the world. I loved working with Patrick Stewart. It was an incredible experience. It was very stressful, partly because when women do things in Hollywood it becomes this story. There was a story around “Charlie’s Angels” that I was creating some feminist manifesto. I was just making an action movie. I would’ve liked to have made “Mission: Impossible,” but women aren’t directing “Mission: Impossible.” I was able to direct an action movie, frankly, because it starred women and I’m a female director, and that is the confine right now in Hollywood. I wish that the movie had not been presented as just for girls, because I didn’t make it just for girls. There was a disconnect on the marketing side of it for me.“

Accolades

References

External links

 
 

Charlie's Angels (franchise)
2019 films
2019 action comedy films
2010s female buddy films
2010s feminist films
American action comedy films
American female buddy films
American feminist comedy films
American sequel films
Brownstone Productions films
Columbia Pictures films
Film spin-offs
Films based on television series
Films directed by Elizabeth Banks
Films produced by Elizabeth Banks
Films produced by Doug Belgrad
Films scored by Brian Tyler
Films set in 2018
Films set in 2019
Films set in Berlin
Films set in Hamburg
Films set in Istanbul
Films set in London
Films set in Los Angeles
Films set in Paris
Films set in Rio de Janeiro (city)
Films shot in Hamburg
Films shot in Istanbul
IMAX films
Perfect World Pictures films
Techno-thriller films
2010s English-language films
2010s American films